Gallaratese is a district ("quartiere") of Milan, Italy, part of the Zone 8 administrative division of the city. It is located about 7 km north-west of the city centre. It borders on the comune of Pero to the north and on the districts of Trenno to the west and Lampugnano to the south; to the east, its ideal border is the eponymous street, which in turn is named after Gallarate, the town it leads to.

Overview
The district is clearly subdivided into two parts; the first one, in the area of Via Cechov, has developed after the other one, enclosed between Via Cilea and Via Apennini; this latter, older part of the district is sometimes referred to as quartiere San Leonardo. These two parts are connected by a major shopping mall called Bonola. 

Gallaratese is one of the largest districts in Italy to have been built "from scratch" in the 20th century (between the 1960s and 1980s) in a previously rural area. The Olona river, which traverses the district, has been laid underground. The first buildings to be created in Gallaratese were large apartment blocks; smaller palaces were added later. Today, the district has a population of about 60,000. The district is well connected by public transportation; it has four stops of the Milan Metro subway and five bus lines traversing it. It is also close to major thoroughfares such as the Tangenziale and the Strada del Sempione. 

A major landmark of the Gallaratese district is Monte Amiata, a complex of apartment blocks that were designed by Carlo Aymonino, and that are characterized by a futuristic architecture. The most typical buildings are the so-called "tower houses" (case torri in Italian, tower-shaped apartment blocks.

History

The project for the Gallaraterse district was first laid down by architect Piero Bottoni in the mid 20th century. The objective was to create a low-income housing district with green areas, effective traffic connection to the city, and functional public services. Construction began in 1957, from a first core of the district named "Gallaratese G.1". The original plan by Bottoni was then refined and developed by over 60 architects, led by Gianluigi Reggio.  A second and third part of the district, named "Gallaratese G.2" and "San Leonardo" respectively, were developed between 1964 and 1974.  In those years, the "tower houses" that now characterize the Gallaratese' skyline were built.  The final outcome was quite different from the original plans; the district was in fact developed with less green areas and less services than it had been planned, resulting in a definitely "satellite" district. 

In the last decades of the 20th century the district has grown larger, gradually extending north up to the borders of Pero; the Bonola shopping mall was also created.

Footnotes

External links
 Portal of the Gallaratese district (in Italian)

Districts of Milan